Eduardo Felipe Cabrera Ganoza (11 April 1947 – 28 February 2020) was a Peruvian engineer and Fujimorist politician. He was a congressman of the Republic for the department of Ica during the period 2011-2016.

Biography 
Cabrera was born in Lima, Peru, on April 11, 1947. He completed his primary and secondary studies at the Colegio Sagrados Corazones Recoleta in his hometown. Between 1970 and 1975 he studied geological engineering at the Universidad Nacional Mayor de San Marcos. His professional activity took place in the private sphere as manager or president of the board of companies and owner of an agricultural estate in the department of Ica.

He died in the city of Lima, on February 28, 2020, victim of pneumonia. He was buried in the Parque de Recuerdo cemetery in Lurín.

References 

Fujimorista politicians
1947 births
2020 deaths
Members of the Congress of the Republic of Peru
People from Lima
People from Ica Region

20th-century Peruvian engineers